The Gent–Wevelgem U23 / Kattekoers-Ieper is a European single day cycle race held in the Belgian region of Flanders. As of 2011, the race is organized as a 1.2 event on the UCI Europe Tour. The race is considered to be the under-23 verson of the Gent–Wevelgem classic.

The Kattekoers was created in 1934, initially as The three belfry cities. The race started in Ghent, passed Bruges and ended in Ypres, three cities which have a belfry, hence the name. More recently, the starting location has been changed to Deinze instead of Ghent.

Winners

See also
Belfry of Bruges
Belfry of Ghent

External links
 

Cycle races in Belgium
UCI Europe Tour races
Recurring sporting events established in 1934
1934 establishments in Belgium